The Martyrs of Alkmaar were a group of 5 Dutch Catholic clerics, secular and religious,  who were hanged on 24 June 1572 in the town of Alkmaar by militant Dutch Calvinists during the 16th-century religious wars—specifically, the Dutch Revolt against Spanish rule, which developed into the Eighty Years' War. These atrocities were inflicted by the Calvinist leader, Diederik Sonoy.

The 5 martyrs

 Daniël van Arendonk
 Hadrianus van Gouda
 Cornelis van Diest
 Johannes van Naarden
 Lodewijk Voets (also known by his Latin name Ludovicus Boethuis)

Engelbert Terburg, a lay brother of the Franciscan monastery outside Alkmaar, was transferred by Sonoy to the village of Ransdorp, near Amsterdam, where he was hanged on 11 August 1572 after being subjected to torture.

See also
 Martyrs of Gorkum
 Martyrs of Roermond

Notes

Bibliography 
On the Alkmaar martyrs, see Willibrord Lampen, “De martyribus Alcmariensibus P. Daniele ab Arendonck et sociis O.F.M.,” Archivum Franciscanum Historicum, 16 (1923), 453–468; and 17 (1924), 13–29, 169–182; W. Nolet, “De historische waarheid aangaande de Alkmaarsche martelaren,” Studia Catholica, 5 (1928–1929), 171–199; Willibrord Lampen, “De dienaar Gods P. Daniel van Arendonk O. F. M., martelaar van Alkmaar”. Brabantia, 4 (1955), 65–72.

16th-century births
1572 deaths
Lists of Christian martyrs
Dutch Roman Catholic saints
Eighty Years' War (1566–1609)
History of South Holland
Martyred groups
Deaths by hanging
16th-century Christian saints
16th-century Roman Catholic martyrs
Martyred Roman Catholic priests
1572 in Europe
Alkmaar